The Floral Formation is a geologic formation in Saskatchewan. It preserves fossils.

See also

 List of fossiliferous stratigraphic units in Saskatchewan

References
 

Geology of Saskatchewan